Draško is a South Slavic male given name predominantly used by Serbs and Montenegrins.

It may refer to: 

 Drosaico or Draško, Duke of the Narentines (fl. 839)
 Draško Božović, Montenegrin footballer
 Draško Petrović, Serbian politician and businessman
 Draško Mrvaljević, Montenegrin handball player
 Draško Vojinović, Serbian football player
 Draško Brguljan, Montenegrin water polo player
 Draško Knežević, Bosnian Serb basketball player

See also
 Drażko, cognate West Slavic male given name, referred to a duke of the Obotrites (d. 802)
 Drašković
 Draškovac
 Drago (given name)

Slavic masculine given names
Serbian masculine given names
Montenegrin masculine given names
Masculine given names